Capital punishment is a legal penalty in Libya. Libya is classified as "Retentionist." Its last known executions were carried out in 2010. The execution method is shooting.

Libya is believed to have handed down death sentences in 2021, but the number is unknown. The World Coalition Against the Death Penalty estimates there are 500 people under sentence of death in Libya; Amnesty International, on the other hand, states that a figure cannot be established for Libya.

References

Libya
Law of Libya